Amputee football is a disabled sport played with seven players on each team (six outfield players and one goalkeeper). Outfield players have lower extremity amputations, and goalkeepers have an upper extremity amputation. Outfield players use loftstrand (forearm) crutches, and play without their prosthesis.

History
The game was created by Don Bennett, who was inspired from his accidental kick of basketballs on a crutch in 1982. In 1985, it became international with the help of soccer coach Bill Barry.

In 2023, Marcin Oleksy from Warta Poznań, Poland became the first amputee footballer to win the FIFA Puskás Award for "most beautiful goal of the year" at The Best FIFA Football Awards 2022 ceremony.

Around the world
There are several amputee football associations around the world. A couple examples of this are the England Amputee Association and The Irish Amputee Football Association. Each organization promotes the advancement of the sport and that it gains more recognition. The England Amputee Football Association states their main goal on their website as: "The England Amputee Football Association's aim is to provide all amputees, people with congenital limb deficiencies and persons with restricted use of limbs, with the opportunity to play football locally, nationally and internationally."

Main competitions

Amputee Football World Cup

European Amputee Football Championship

Other championships

Rules
The official FIFA sanctioned rules are:

 An amputee is defined as someone who is 'abbreviated' at or near the ankle or wrist.
 Outfield players may have two hands but only one leg, whereas goalkeepers may have two feet but only one hand.
 The game is played with metal crutches and without prostheses, the only exception being that bi-lateral amputees may play with a prosthesis.
 Players may not use crutches to advance, control or block the ball. Such an action will be penalised in the same way as a handball infringement. However, incidental contact between crutch and ball is tolerated.
 Players may not use their residual limbs to voluntarily advance, control or block the ball. Such an action will be penalised in the same way as a handball infringement. However, incidental contact between residual limb and ball is tolerated.
 Shin pads must be worn.
 Use of a crutch against a player will lead to ejection from the game and a penalty kick for the opposing team.
 The pitch measures a maximum of 70 x 60 metres
 The dimensions of the goals are 2.2 metres maximum (height) x 5 metres maximum (width) x 1 metre (depth)
 A FIFA standard ball is used
 Games consist of two 25-minute halves (variable according to the tournament), with a ten-minute rest period in between
 Both teams are allowed a two-minute time-out per game
 Offside rules do not apply in amputee football
 International rules stipulate that a team be made up of six outfield players and a goalkeeper. However, certain tournaments require teams of four outfield players plus goalkeeper, as was the case in Sierra Leone.
 A goalkeeper is not permitted to leave his or her area. Should this occur deliberately, the goalkeeper will be ejected from the game and the opposing team awarded a penalty kick.
 An unlimited number of substitutions can be made, at any point during the game.

See also 
 Amputee Football World Cup
 Team Zaryen
 European Amputee Football Federation

References

External links

 History of Amputee Soccer

 
Association football variants
football